DRG London is a Digital Audio Broadcasting multiplex available in the London area that has been broadcasting since January 2002. It is also referred to as the Greater London 3 multiplex. The station operates from ten transmitters: Croydon, Alexandra Palace, Blue Bell Hill, Reigate, Guildford, Brookmans Park, Zouches Farm, BT Bedmont, High Wycombe and Kemsing.

The Kemsing site (2 kW) was replaced in 2010 by the more powerful Wrotham site (5 kW) in Kent.

Stations available

See also 

 CE London
 Switch London

References

External links 
 Technical information
 Coverage map
 DRG's website

Digital audio broadcasting multiplexes